Kayax Production & Publishing Sp. z o.o. is an independent Polish entertainment company that operates a record label, music publisher, management and concert agency. It was founded by singer Kayah and her business partner, musician Tomasz Grewiński, in 2001 in Warsaw. Kayah was initially founded as a record label. In 2003, Kayax signed chillout duo 15 Minut Projekt and producer Envee.

Folk, hip-hop and rock acts have signed with Kayax. The label's best-selling artists include alternative singer Maria Peszek, jazz-pop singer Krzysztof Kiljański and folk pop band Zakopower, yielding albums certified Gold and Platinum in Poland.

Artists

Current

Artur Rojek (recording contract)
Atom String Quartet (recording contract)
Monika Brodka (recording contract and management)
Urszula Dudziak (recording and management contract)
Maria Peszek (management contract, formerly also recording contract)
Marek Dyjak (recording and management contract)
Mery Spolsky
Fox (recording contract)
Grabek (recording contract)
HEY (recording and management contract)
Krzysztof Zalewski (recording contract)
June (recording and management contract)
Kayah (recording and management contract)
Loco Star (recording contract)
Kasia Nosowska (recording and management contract)
Patrick The Pan (recording and management contract)
Sara Brylewska (recording contract)
Skubas (recording and management contract)
Andrzej Smolik (recording and management contract)
Zakopower (recording and management contract)

Former

15 Minut Projekt (recording contract)
Andrzej Bachleda (recording contract)
Bisquit (recording contract)
Benzyna (recording contract)
Buldog (recording contract)
Envee (recording contract)
IncarNations (recording contract)
Krzysztof Kiljański (recording contract)
L.U.C (recording contract)
Marcin Wyrostek (recording contract)
Maja Kleszcz & IncarNations (recording contract)
Mosqitoo (recording contract)
Natalia Lubrano (recording contract)
Novika (recording contract)
Snowman (recording contract)
Sofa (recording contract)
Tatiana Okupnik (recording contract)
Warsaw Village Band (recording contract)

References

External links

Polish companies established in 2001
Mass media companies established in 2001
Polish independent record labels